Florence Margaret Martus (August 7, 1868 – February 8, 1943), also known as "the Waving Girl", took it upon herself to be the unofficial greeter of all ships that entered and left the Port of Savannah, Georgia, between 1887 and 1931. A few years after she began waving at passing sailors, she moved in with her brother, a light keeper, at his small white cottage about five miles up the river from Fort Pulaski. From her rustic home on Elba Island, a tiny piece of land in the Savannah River near the Atlantic Ocean, Martus would wave a handkerchief by day and a lantern by night. According to legend, not a ship was missed in her forty-four years on watch.  A statue of Martus by the sculptor Felix de Weldon has been erected in Morrell Park on the historic riverfront of Savannah.

Early life
Martus was born on August 7, 1868, in Cockspur Island, near Savannah. She was the daughter of German-born Civil War veteran John H. Martus and Rosanna Cecilia Decker. She had five siblings: Catherine, Annie, Charles, George and Mary. John Martus was an ordnance sergeant at Fort Pulaski on Cockspur Island.

Following her father's death (by 1890), the family moved to Savannah. They returned to Elba Island when George became keeper of the Elba and South Channel lights.

Legends
Many legends endure about Martus, notably the following:
 The reason she greeted ships was because as a young girl, she had fallen in love with a sailor and wanted to be sure he would find her when he returned. When, after 44 years, he did not, she died of a broken heart.
 Sailors would bring her gifts. 
 When the captain of the ship that brought her memorial statue to Savannah arrived, he refused to accept payment because of his fond memories of Martus.

Personal life
When her brother, George, retired, they both moved to Bona Bella in Savannah, with the mayor of Savannah officially welcoming them to the city.

Death
Martus died on February 8, 1943, aged 74. After a service at the Cathedral of St. John the Baptist, she was buried in a family plot at Laurel Grove North Cemetery.

Legacy
On September 27, 1943 Liberty ship SS Florence Martus was named in her honor.

In 1999, the city of Savannah named its ferry service the Savannah Belles Ferry after five of Savannah's notable women, including Florence Martus.[90]

The Waving Girl historical marker was officially dedicated in 1958 and is located near the visitor center at Fort Pulaski.

Notes

External links
 Savannah Online article
 The Waving Girl historical marker

1868 births
1943 deaths
People from Savannah, Georgia
People from Chatham County, Georgia